One Capital Center is a high rise building in Boise, Idaho. It is located at 999 Main Street. The building has 14 floors and is 206 feet tall and was completed in 1975 by Mountain Bell. From 1975 to 1978 it was the tallest building in the city of Boise and the state of Idaho, but now it is the third tallest building in Boise. Billionaire J. R. Simplot (1909-2008) had an office on the top floor of this building. In April 2009, a webcam was set up to view a pair of peregrine falcons incubating four eggs in a nest on the fourteenth floor of the One Capital Center Building.

See also
 List of tallest buildings in Boise
 Boise, Idaho

References

External links

Peregrine Falcon Webcam

Skyscraper office buildings in Boise, Idaho
Office buildings completed in 1975
1975 establishments in Idaho